Gumal (also known as Goghmal, Gomel and Marga) was a diocese of the Syriac Orthodox Church.  Bishops of Gumal are attested between the sixth and tenth centuries, but the diocese may have persisted into the thirteenth century.

Sources 
The main primary sources for the Syriac Orthodox bishops of Gumal are the Chronicle of the Syriac Orthodox patriarch Michael the Syrian (1166–99) and the Chronicon Ecclesiasticum of the Jacobite maphrian Bar Hebraeus (ob.1286).

Location 
The diocese of Gumal was located in the Mosul district of northern Iraq, not far from the celebrated Jacobite monastery of Mar Mattai.  According to Bar Hebraeus, Gumal was 'a large town in the country of Marga, to the northeast of Mount Alpap'.  The town is probably connected with the district of Tel Gomel (in Greek, Gaugamela), which gave its name to Alexander the Great’s victory over the Persians at Gaugamela in 333 BC. The battle seems to have been fought at a site close to the modern Assyrian town of Telkepe, in the historic Marga district.

Bishops of Gumal 
The diocese of Gumal was the fifth of the twelve dioceses established by the eastern Jacobite bishops in 595.

The Jacobite bishop Aitallaha was consecrated in 629 'for the town of Gumal'.

The Jacobite bishop Yonan of 'Gulmarga' was deposed in 790 at a synod held by the eastern bishops in the monastery of Knushia in the Balad district.

The Jacobite bishop Barhadbshabba 'of Marga' subscribed to the acts of the synod of Callinicus in 818.

In 1283, according to Bar Hebraeus, the diocese of Gumal was ruined:

Even if I wanted to be patriarch, as many others do, what is there to covet in the appointment, since so many dioceses of the East have been devastated?  Should I set my heart on Antioch, where sighs and groans will meet me?  Or the holy diocese of Gumal, where nobody is left to piss against a wall?

Notes

References 
 
 
 Jean-Baptiste Chabot, Chronique de Michel le Syrien, Patriarche Jacobite d'Antiche (1166-1199). Éditée pour la première fois et traduite en francais I-IV (1899;1901;1905;1910; a supplement to volume I containing an introduction to Michael and his work, corrections, and an index, was published in 1924. Reprinted in four volumes 1963, 2010).

Syriac Orthodox dioceses
Oriental Orthodoxy in Iraq